MasterChef Thailand (season 5) is the fifth season of the Thai version of the competitive reality TV series MasterChef. The show premiered on Channel 7 on February 13, 2022. ,  and Pongtawat Chalermkittichai all returned as judges in this season.  also returned as the host.

Applications for contestants of the fifth season were opened on October 6, 2021, ending at October 31, 2021, with one of the additional requirements being that auditionees must not have more than 3 months worth of cookery education (courses in individual dishes are still allowed)

Contestants

Elimination table

 (WINNER) This cook won the competition.
 (RUNNER-UP) This cook finished in second place.
 (WIN) The cook won an individual challenge (Mystery box challenge / Invention Test / Skills Test or Elimination Test)
 (WIN) The cook was on the winning in the Between two persons challenge.
 (WIN) The cook was on the winning team in the "Team challenge" and directly advanced to the next round.
 (HIGH) The cook was one of the top entries in an individual challenge, but didn't win.
 (IN) The cook wasn't selected as a top or bottom entry in an individual challenge.
 (IN) The cook wasn't selected as a top or bottom entry in a team challenge.
 (IMM) The cook didn't have to compete in that round of the competition and was safe from elimination.
 (IMM) The cook didn't have to compete in that round of the competition and was safe from elimination with Golden apron.
 (PT) The cook was on the losing team in the Team challenge and competed in the Pressure test.
 (PT) The cook didn't have to compete in the Team challenge but competed in the Pressure test.
 (NPT) The cook was on the losing team in the Team challenge, did not compete in the Pressure test, and advanced.
 (RET) The cook won the Reinstation Challenge and returned to the competition.
 (LOW) The cook was one of the bottom entries in an individual challenge, but wasn't the last person to advance.
 (LOW) The cook was one of the bottom entries in an individual challenge, and the last person to advance.
 (LOW) The cook was one of the bottom entries in the Team challenge and they were the only person from their team to advance.
 (LOW) The cook was one of the bottom entries in the Team challenge, and their team was last to advance.
 (QRT) The cook was quarantined due to them being in the risk group of getting COVID-19.
 (ELIM) The cook was eliminated from MasterChef.

Episodes

References

2022 Thai television seasons
MasterChef Thailand